Harry James Sinden (born September 14, 1932) is a Canadian former ice hockey player, coach, and executive. He served as a coach, general manager, and team president for the Boston Bruins of the National Hockey League (NHL), and was the coach of Team Canada during the 1972 Summit Series. He is a member of the Hockey Hall of Fame in the builders category.

Playing career
Sinden played defence for the Toronto Marlboros bantams before moving up to the Oshawa Generals of the Ontario Hockey Association
 for junior hockey. He played in Oshawa from 1949 to 1953, and then for six seasons in the OHA senior division with the Whitby Dunlops. He was team captain when the Dunlops won the Allan Cup in 1957, and then the 1958 World Hockey Championship for Canada in Oslo, Norway. He also won a silver medal as a member of the Canadian national men's hockey team at the 1960 Winter Olympics
 in Squaw Valley, California. The core of the team was the Kitchener-Waterloo Dutchmen, with Sinden one of four players from the Dunlops added to the lineup to strengthen the team for the Olympics.

Near the end of the season, the Montreal Canadiens placed Sinden on their negotiation list but didn't reach an agreement with him. After playing some games with the Hull-Ottawa Canadiens in the Eastern Professional Hockey League he met Lynn Patrick, general manager of the Boston Bruins, who signed him as player – assistant coach for the Kingston Frontenacs, the Bruins' EPHL affiliate, starting in 1960–61. He was named a first-team all-star for the 1961–62 season and league MVP for 1962–63. After the league folded, the team became the Minneapolis Bruins of the Central Hockey League for the 1963–64 season with Sinden as player-coach. After two seasons the team moved again, becoming the Oklahoma City Blazers, where Sinden finished his playing career in 1965–66 after six seasons with the franchise. In that final season, he coached the team to the league championship.

Coaching in the NHL
In May 1966, Sinden moved up to the NHL as head coach of the Boston Bruins. At 33 he was the youngest coach in the league at the time, coaching the youngest team. In his first season — with a team that included rookie Bobby Orr—the Bruins finished out of the playoffs with the worst record in the league. But in his second year, aided by the acquisitions of Phil Esposito, Ken Hodge and Fred Stanfield in a blockbuster deal with the Chicago Black Hawks, the team posted a winning record. In his third season, the Bruins finished with 100 points just behind the Montreal Canadiens for top spot in the NHL. In his fourth season, 1969–70, he coached the Bruins to their first Stanley Cup in 29 years.

Retirement and Summit Series
Despite his success with the team, Sinden had a rocky relationship with Bruins management during the championship season, which led to the 37-year-old Sinden's announcing his retirement just days after winning the Cup. The club placed him on its voluntary retired list, preventing him from taking a job with another team for one year. He then accepted a job with Stirling Homex Corporation, a home construction company in Rochester, New York. In October 1970, he published a story in Sports Illustrated declaring he had left the Bruins because of their mid-season refusal to give him a raise for the following year.

Sinden was offered the job as first head coach of the New York Islanders at the beginning of 1972, but turned it down. He also rejected offers from the Toronto Maple Leafs and the St. Louis Blues. In June 1972, after two years away from hockey, he was named head coach and manager of the Canadian team for the eight-game Summit Series. After a slow start, he led the Canadians to a come-from-behind win capped by Paul Henderson's series-winning goal with 34 seconds remaining in the final game. Esposito, reunited with Sinden, was the leading scorer in the series.

Sinden maintained a tape-recorded diary throughout the series which was turned into a book, Hockey Showdown, published in 1972.

Returns to the Bruins

Within days after the Summit Series, he signed a five-year deal to return to the Bruins as their general manager, succeeding Milt Schmidt, who was named to the post of executive director. He went on to spend just over 28 years as general manager of the Bruins before he stepped down on October 25, 2000, in favour of his assistant GM, Mike O'Connell. His 28-year tenure almost equalled the 30-year reign (1924–54) of Art Ross, the team's founding manager. Sinden, who had added the title of club president in December 1988, remained as the chief executive of the Bruins until the summer of 2006, when he retired to a consulting role.

As GM, Sinden presided over the team's long years of consistent success, setting the North American major professional record for most consecutive seasons in the playoffs with 29, which including making the finals five times (1974, 1977, 1978, 1988, 1990 — losing the finals each time) and two regular-season first-place finishes (1983, 1990).

Notwithstanding this longstanding success, he was the subject of controversies ranging from video replays to salary arbitration and was under frequent fire from Bruin fans. In the 1996–97 season, the NHL fined him $5,000 USD for verbal abuse of a video-replay official
 who had disallowed a goal in the second period of a game between the Bruins and the Ottawa Senators. He also refused to honor a salary-arbitration award and let Dmitri Khristich, a 29-goal scorer, leave the team without compensation. He had been highly critical of Khristich's performance in the playoffs, and was angered when an arbitrator awarded him a salary of $2.8 million.

Sinden is currently the Bruins' Senior Advisor to the Owner, as well as a member of the selection committee for the Hockey Hall of Fame. He is also a "Hockey GM & Scouting" instructor for the online sports-career training school Sports Management Worldwide, founded and run by Dr. Lynn Lashbrook. In 2011, his name was inscribed on the Stanley Cup for a second time, 41 years after his first Stanley Cup title as a coach.

Career coaching record

Personal life
Sinden and his wife, Eleanor, have four daughters and reside in Winchester, Massachusetts. He was the godfather of Canadian rock musician Gord Downie, the late lead singer of The Tragically Hip.

Popular culture
Sinden was played by Booth Savage in Canada Russia '72, a television miniseries based on the 1972 Summit Series.
Sinden was played by Ian Tracy in "Keep Your Head Up, Kid: The Don Cherry Story", a television special by CBC based on the life of coach and sports commentator Don Cherry.

References

Bibliography

Filmography

External links
 

1932 births
Living people
Boston Bruins coaches
Boston Bruins executives
Canada men's national ice hockey team coaches
Canadian ice hockey coaches
Canadian ice hockey defencemen
Hockey Hall of Fame inductees
Ice hockey players at the 1960 Winter Olympics
IIHF Hall of Fame inductees
Lester Patrick Trophy recipients
Medalists at the 1960 Winter Olympics
National Hockey League executives
Olympic ice hockey players of Canada
Olympic medalists in ice hockey
Olympic silver medalists for Canada
Oshawa Generals players
People from York, Toronto
Stanley Cup champions
Stanley Cup championship-winning head coaches
Oklahoma City Blazers (1965–1977) players